Bulbophyllum drymoglossum is a species of orchid.

External links 
 

drymoglossum